The Defoe Shipbuilding Company was a small ship builder established in 1905 in Bay City, Michigan, United States.  It ceased to operate in 1976 after failing to renew its contracts with the United States Navy.  The site of the former company is now being developed for business and housing on the bank of the Saginaw River.

Founding
Harry J. Defoe organized the Defoe Boat and Motor Works in 1905 on the Saginaw River in Bay City, Michigan.  At that time, the firm built "knock-down" boats and gasoline powered boats for business and pleasure.  In 1917, the company got its first Navy contract for five Spent Torpedo Chasers.  This order was followed in 1918 by an order for eight steel Tumor Mine Planters.

From 1920 to 1939, the company built various types of government and commercial vessels and private yachts, including three 165-ft patrol boats, thirteen 100-ft patrol boats, fifteen 75-foot patrol boats and two harbor tugs for the U.S. Coast Guard. In 1931, Defoe built the Lenore, a  yacht for Montgomery Ward Chairman Sewell Avery, who named it after his second daughter who died at the age of four; this yacht was taken by the U.S. Government in World War II for coastal picket duty by the Coast Guard, and in 1956 it was assigned as a Presidential Yacht.  It was called the Barbara Anne by President Eisenhower after his granddaughter, the Honey Fitz by President Kennedy in honor of his maternal grandfather John Francis Fitzgerald, and the Tricia by President Nixon after his daughter.  In 1941, the name of the company was changed to Defoe Shipbuilding Company.

World War II

During World War II, all production went to the war effort.  From 1939 to 1945, the company built 154 ships, including four s, 17 destroyer escorts (of those 3 were converted to APDs after serving as DEs for some time), 11 High speed transports (APDs) (converted destroyer escorts, but launched as such), patrol craft, and numerous landing craft of various types. The brand-new Defoe family yacht even served with the US Navy as a patrol vessel.  Defoe developed a construction technique called the "upside-down and roll-over" method.  This allowed most of the welding of the hull to be done "hand down" which is much easier. After the hull was completely welded, it was rolled over by a set of large wheels fastened to each end of the hull.  Work then continued on the ship right-side up.  Faster welding allowed the company to build one 173-foot patrol craft every week.  Of all of the major ships built there, the three that were lost in action during World War II were the destroyer escort , the U.S. Coast Guard Cutter , and the patrol craft .  Submarine chaser PC 482 was sunk by a U-boat in 1945. Defoe Shipbuilding Company also built three Refrigerated Freight Barges : YFR-888, YFR-889 and YFR-890 in 1945, also called a reefer barge.

List of Ships
13 of 148 s
  ... 
4 of 22 s
  ... 
 11 of 50 s
  ... 
 4 of 95 s
  ... 
 47 of 923 Landing Craft Infantry
 LCI(L) 1052 ... LCI(L) 1098
 56 of 343 s
  ... 
  ... 
  ... 
  ... 
ref:

After World War II

After World War II, this company built two large Great Lakes bulk carriers, and it did repair work on Great Lakes ships including several repowerings, and self-unloading conversions. In later years, several ships were built for the U.S. Navy, including two s, four  guided missile destroyers, and three Garcia-class destroyer escorts (later re-classified as frigates) for the U.S. Navy, and three guided-missile destroyers for the Royal Australian Navy.

Great Lakes Bulk Freighters
In the early 1950s Defoe Shipbuilding constructed two large Great Lakes freighters.  They were both roughly based on U.S. Steel's Pittsburgh Steamship Company AA Class ship design and shared similar dimensions.  As of April 2009, one of the two vessels is still in service on the Great Lakes.

The only remaining large Great Lakes bulk freight vessel built by Defoe Shipbuilding still in service is the 642' 03" long, M/V Ojibway (Defoe hull #00422) operated by the Canadian firm Lower Lakes Towing, of Port Dover, Ontario, Canada.  The Ojibway was originally built as the steamer Charles L. Hutchinson (2) for the Pioneer Steamship Company of Cleveland, Ohio, and entered service on September 24, 1952.  In 1961, the Hutchinson was sold to Ford Motor Company of Dearborn, Michigan and was renamed Ernest M. Breech.  In 1988, Ford was in the process of eliminating its Great Lakes shipping fleet and sold the Breech to George Steinbrenner's Kinsman Marine of Cleveland, Ohio.  The Kinsman fleet in turn renamed the vessel Kinsman Independent (2).  She sailed with Kinsman until 2002 when her main unloading dock in Buffalo, New York, updated its unloading equipment, allowing it to be serviced by newer more common self-unloading vessels.  The vessel laid up in Buffalo for the last time under US flag on December 16, 2002.  In the spring of 2004, McKeil Marine of Hamilton, Ontario, Canada purchased the Kinsman Independent.  The ship was refurbished and repowered with a diesel engine,  then sold to Voyageur Marine Transport LTD., of Ridgeville, Ontario, who returned her to service in late 2005 under the name Voyageur Independent.  Her current owner (Lower Lakes Towing) has operated the vessel since August 28, 2007, and renamed her Ojibway on February 29, 2008.

The second Great Lakes freighter built by Defoe was the 644' long S/S Richard M. Marshall (Defoe hull #00424) which was constructed in 1953 for the Great Lakes Steamship Company, of Cleveland, Ohio.  She was a near twin to her predecessor (Charles L. Hutchinson) in size and capacity both having approximate dimensions of 640' long, 67' wide, 35' deep, and a cargo capacity of approximately 18,500 tons.  In December, 1956, Great Lakes Steamship started the process of selling off their fleet, and the Marshall was sold to The Northwestern Mutual Life Insurance Company.  Starting with the 1957 season, Northwestern Mutual chartered the ship to the Wilson Marine Transit Company of Cleveland, Ohio, who in turn renamed the vessel Joseph S. Wood.  In 1966, the charter agreement between Wilson and Northwestern Mutual was canceled, and the vessel was sold to the Ford Motor Company of Dearborn, Michigan, for $4.3 million (US).  Ford renamed the ship John Dykstra and she resumed trading on the Great Lakes on May 11, 1966.  In 1983, Ford renamed the ship Benson Ford (2) after the retirement of the original S/S Benson Ford.  In 1985, the vessel was renamed US.265808 (the name Benson Ford being passed on to a third vessel), and was withdrawn from service.  The final voyage began when she cleared Quebec City, Quebec, Canada in tow of the Polish tug Jantar on August 11, 1987 along with the former US Steel freighter T. W. Robinson bound for Recife, Brazil, for dismantling.

Closure

The yard closed on 31 December 1976 after the Navy contracts expired.  Along with its dwindling navy contracts in its final years, the yard was contracted for three larger Great Lakes Freighter projects.  The first project was construction of the 68'x 104'7"x 46'6" bow section to the 1000' long integrated tug and barge Presque Isle.  The bow was launched July 27, 1972 and was towed to Erie by the tugs Maryland and Laurence C. Turner arriving October 6, 1972. There it was combined with the remainder of the barge which was under construction at Erie, PA.  The combined tug and barge unit were the second 1000' vessel trading on the lakes.  The second was the conversion of 690' S/S Herbert C. Jackson from a conventional style Great Lakes freighter to a self unloader.  The final major project was the conversion of the 620' lake freighter Richard J. Reiss from steam to diesel power.  All three vessels are still activity trading on the Great Lakes, the latter sailing now as the M/V Manistee.  The site of the shipyard later became the location for H. H. Hirschfield & Sons scrap yard.  Hirschfield was recently bought by OmniSource, Inc., another scrap company.

Ships built by the Defoe Shipbuilding Company
 (17 September 1932)
 (2 August 1934)
 (5 September 1934)
 (23 March 1939)
 (23 March 1939)
 (18 January 1943)
 (22 June 1943)
 (21 July 1943)
 (20 November 1943)
 (15 February 1944)
 (21 March 1944)
USS Cronin (DE/DEC-704) (5 May 1944)
 (4 July 1944)
 (26 August 1944)
 (17 February 1945)
USS Kleinsmith (DE-718) (12 June 1945)
 (2 November 1955)
 (5 January 1956)
 (28 July 1959)
 (27 April 1960)
 (4 August 1960)
HMAS Perth (D 38) (28 September 1963)
HMAS Hobart (D 39) (9 January 1964)
 (4 February 1965)
 (8 June 1965)
 (20 October 1965)
HMAS Brisbane (D 41) (5 May 1966)
 (31 July 1969)
 (30 October 1969)
Presque Isle (27 July 1972)

See also
Lightship Huron
 Wooden boats of World War 2

References

External links

Information on the Defoe Shipbuilding Company on defoenet.com
The story of Harry J. Defoe and his company at bay-journal.com

History of Michigan
United States home front during World War II
Defunct shipbuilding companies of the United States
Bay City, Michigan
Saginaw River
Defunct manufacturing companies based in Michigan